To Love Ru is a Japanese manga series written by Saki Hasemi and illustrated by Kentaro Yabuki. The series was published by Shueisha in Weekly Shōnen Jump magazine from April 24, 2006, to August 31, 2009. It chronicles the life of high school student Rito Yuuki after he meets and accidentally gets engaged to the alien princess Lala Satalin Deviluke. The 162 chapters were collected into 18 tankōbon volumes, published between November 2, 2006 and April 2, 2010. The series was republished in a 10-volume bunkoban edition between November 18, 2016 and March 17, 2017. To celebrate Yabuki's 20th anniversary as a professional artist, a special To Love Ru story was published in Weekly Shōnen Jump on April 27, 2019. A To Love Ru one-shot was released on the Shōnen Jump+ website on January 13, 2023, to commemorate an art exhibition held as a conclusion to the manga's 15th anniversary celebrations.

A continuation of the manga, titled To Love Ru Darkness, was serialized in Shueisha's monthly Jump Square magazine from October 4, 2010 to March 4, 2017. Two additional "extra" chapters were published in the May and June 2017 issues of Jump Square. The 77 chapters of the manga were collected into 18 tankōbon volumes, published between March 4, 2011 and April 4, 2017. A full-color To Love Ru Darkness one-shot was published in Jump Square on May 2, 2019 to celebrate Yabuki's 20th anniversary as a professional artist. The series was republished in a 10-volume bunkoban edition between October 16, 2020 and February 18, 2021. 



Volume list

To Love Ru

To Love Ru Darkness

Chapters not in tankōbon format
  – Published in Jump Square on April 1, 2017. Later included in the To Love Ru Chronicle book and To Love Ru Darkness bunkoban volume 10.
  – Published in Jump Square on May 1, 2017. Later included in the To Love Ru Chronicle book and To Love Ru Darkness bunkoban volume 10.
  – Published in Jump Square on November 4, 2017.
  – Published in Weekly Shōnen Jump on April 27, 2019.
  – Published in Jump Square on May 2, 2019.
  – Released on the Shōnen Jump+ website on January 13, 2023.

References

To Love Ru
Chapters